Primary Colours is the second studio album by English rock band The Horrors. It was released in the US on 21 April 2009, and in the UK on 4 May 2009 by XL Recordings.

Background 
The album was produced by Geoff Barrow of Portishead, Craig Silvey and music video director Chris Cunningham. Recording took place in Bath during the summer of 2008. The band signed to XL Recordings after they left Loog Records in 2007. Regarding their time in the studio, band member Rhys "Spider" Webb commented: "We had such an amazing time working on it, writing it and getting lost in it... we'd wander into the studio, and then never want to leave". Webb and Tom Cowan, who had joined the band as keyboardist and bass guitarist respectively, switched instruments from this album onwards.

Prior to the album's release, the band released a cover of Suicide's "Shadazz" on a split single released by Blast First Petite as part of their tribute to Alan Vega in October 2008. On 17 March 2009, the eight-minute music video for "Sea Within a Sea", directed by former Jesus and Mary Chain bassist Douglas Hart, was posted on the band's website. The song was released as a digital download-only single, and full details of Primary Colours also surfaced.

In a preview article, music journalist Mike Diver commented that the album was "set to be one of the year's best" and that it was "wholly worth all the hype that's attracted to its unexpected brilliance."

Release 
Primary Colours was released by XL in the US on 21 April 2009, and in the UK on 4 May 2009. The album charted on the UK Albums Chart at No. 25.

Following the album's release, the single "Who Can Say" was released on 7" vinyl.

In 2009, it was awarded a silver certification from the Independent Music Companies Association, which indicated sales of at least 30,000 copies throughout Europe.

Reception 

According to review aggregator website Metacritic, the record was met with "universal critical acclaim", receiving a normalised score of 82% based on 19 reviews.

On 21 July 2009, the album was announced as one of the 12 albums shortlisted for the year's Mercury Prize award. Primary Colours was named the best album of the year by NME and in 2013 they named it the 218th greatest album of all time.

Fact said that the album struck "a rich vein of brawny but windswept psychedelic rock".

Pitchfork emphasized the band's change in style, noting their "shoegazer makeover" and concluding that the album succeeded in "transforming gothic gloom into psychedelic drone".

Calling the album "the triple point where goth, post-punk, and shoegaze met", AllMusic concluded: "As bold and listenable as it is, Primary Colours is occasionally scattered, giving the impression that the band is trying on different sounds for size -- although the fact that most of it works so well is actually more surprising than how different it is from their earlier work''.

Track listing 

All songs written and arranged by the Horrors.

 "Mirror's Image" – 4:50
 "Three Decades" – 2:50
 "Who Can Say" – 3:41
 "Do You Remember" – 3:28
 "New Ice Age" – 4:25
 "Scarlet Fields" – 4:43
 "I Only Think of You" – 7:07
 "I Can't Control Myself" – 3:28
 "Primary Colours" – 3:02
 "Sea Within a Sea" – 8:00

 Japan-only bonus tracks

 "You Could Never Tell" – 3:30
 "Whole New Way" – 4:58
 "Sea Within a Sea" (enhanced video) – 8:24

Personnel 

 The Horrors – production, mixing, engineering
 Craig Silvey – production, mixing, engineering
 Geoff Barrow – production, mixing, engineering
 Chris Cunningham – production on tracks 2 and 9
 Ciaran O'Shea – sleeve artwork

Charts

References

External links 

 

The Horrors albums
2009 albums
XL Recordings albums
Albums produced by Geoff Barrow